Grameen Telecom (GTC) is a "Private Limited Company" by guarantee in Bangladesh established by Muhammad Yunus with a partial stake in Grameen Phone (GP). GTC has driven the pioneering GP program of Village Phone that enables rural poor to own a cell-phone and turn it into a profit making venture. The vision behind the village phone program was formulated by Iqbal Quadir who was convinced that a mobile phone could become a source of income generation. Quadir worked with Yunus and the Norwegian company Telenor to make the program a reality.

Programs

Grameen Telecom has different programs to include rural people into the world of information technology. The Village Phone (Polli Phone; spelling ; pronunciation ) program is the largest among them.

Village Phone
Village Phone is a unique idea that provides modern telecommunication services to underprivileged people in Bangladesh. To become a subscriber of a Village Phone, one must first become a member of Grameen Bank.

These mobile phones have very cheap billing rates and are also given on easy loans from Grameen Bank. Once given a phone, the subscriber is encouraged to provide the services to the people in the adjoining area, covering both outgoing and incoming calls. In this way, he or she can earn money to repay his or her debt to the bank as well as to earn a profit. Many inhabitants of the rural area of Bangladesh, particularly underprivileged women, have been able to change their lives with the help of Village Phone.

Information kiosks
Besides the revolutionary Village Phone program, Grameen Telecom also provides information kiosks. Initially, three pilot kiosks were set up in Tangail district. These kiosks are set up to provide people in the villages of Bangladesh with access to information and communication technology.

Awards

 CAPAM Bronze Award for Service to the Public 1998.
 GSM Association Award for "GSM Community Service" in 1998.
 Petersburg Prize for "Use of IT to improve Poor People's Lives" in 2004.
 First ITU World Information Society Award in 2005.

Sources
Village Phone page on Grameen Phone website  
Talk by Iqbal Quadir, TED Global talking about the Grameen Telecom program

Telecommunications companies of Bangladesh